Michael Charleston “Xiao” Briones Chua (born January 19, 1984) is a Filipino historian, academic, and television personality, best known for his academic works on Philippine history and his numerous appearances as a commentator on historical topics on Philippine television, including a regular appearance on a news segment called "Xiao Time" on public television station People's Television Network. He is currently a professor at De La Salle University.

See also 
 Resil Mojares
 Caroline Hau

References

External links 

21st-century Filipino historians
Living people
Filipino people of Chinese descent
1984 births
Academic staff of De La Salle University